Smoky Hill Township may refer to:

Smoky Hill Township, Geary County, Kansas
Smoky Hill Township, Saline County, Kansas
Smoky Hill Township, McPherson County, Kansas